Elias Hicks Blackburn (September 17, 1827 – April 6, 1908) was the first bishop of the Church of Jesus Christ of Latter-day Saints of Provo and later served as a member of the Utah Territorial Legislature.

Blackburn was born in Bedford County, Pennsylvania.  He became bishop of Provo when a ward was organized there in 1851.  In 1859 he served a mission to Great Britain.  In 1863 he was sent by Church leaders to Beaver County, Utah to serve as Sunday School superintendent.  In 1879 he moved to Wayne County, Utah where he was again made bishop in 1880.  In 1882 he was elected to represent Piute and Beaver Counties in the territorial legislature.

Further reading 
Lillian & Voyle Munson: A gift of Faith

Sources
Andrew Jenson. LDS Biographical Encyclopedia vol. 1, p. 491-492.

References

1827 births
1908 deaths
American leaders of the Church of Jesus Christ of Latter-day Saints
Members of the Utah Territorial Legislature
19th-century American politicians
American Mormon missionaries in England
Politicians from Provo, Utah
Latter Day Saints from Pennsylvania
Latter Day Saints from Utah